Perie is a surname. Notable people with the surname include:

Bianca Perie (born 1990), Romanian hammer thrower
Hugo Perié (1944–2011), Argentine politician
John Perie (1831–1874), Scottish soldier and Victoria Cross recipient

See also
Perry (surname)